Group B of the 2001 Fed Cup Europe/Africa Zone Group II was one of four pools in the Europe/Africa zone of the 2001 Fed Cup. Five teams competed in a round robin competition, with the top team advancing to Group I for 2002.

Portugal vs. Finland

Algeria vs. Morocco

Portugal vs. Algeria

Finland vs. Morocco

Portugal vs. Morocco

Finland vs. Algeria

  placed first in this group and thus advanced to Group I for 2002, where they placed last in their pool of four and thus were relegated back to Group II for 2003.

See also
Fed Cup structure

References

External links
 Fed Cup website

2001 Fed Cup Europe/Africa Zone